Hyaluronan synthase 2 is an enzyme that in humans is encoded by the HAS2 gene.

Hyaluronan or hyaluronic acid is a high molecular weight unbranched polysaccharide synthesized by a wide variety of organisms from bacteria to mammals, and is a constituent of the extracellular matrix.  It consists of alternating glucuronic acid and N-acetylglucosamine residues that are linked by beta-1-3 and beta-1-4 glycosidic bonds.  Hyaluronic acid is synthesized by membrane-bound synthase at the inner surface of the plasma membrane, and the chains are extruded via ABC-Transporter into the extracellular space.  It serves a variety of functions, including space filling, lubrication of joints, and provision of a matrix through which cells can migrate.  Hyaluronic acid is produced during wound healing and tissue repair to provide a framework for ingrowth of blood vessels and fibroblasts.  Changes in the serum concentration of hyaluronic acid are associated with inflammatory and degenerative arthropathies such as rheumatoid arthritis.  In addition, the interaction of hyaluronic acid with the leukocyte receptor CD44 is important in tissue-specific homing by leukocytes, and overexpression of hyaluronic acid receptors has been correlated with tumor metastasis.  HAS2 is a member of the vertebrate gene family encoding putative hyaluronan synthases, and its amino acid sequence shows significant homology to glycosaminoglycan synthetase (DG42) from Xenopus laevis, and human and murine hyaluronan synthase 1.

References

Further reading